I'm a Celebrity...Get Me Out Of Here! (often shortened to I'm a Celebrity or I'm a Celeb) is a British survival reality television show, that is broadcast on ITV. It was created by London Weekend Television (LWT) and is produced by Lifted Entertainment. The format sees a group of celebrities living together in extreme conditions with few creature comforts. Each member undertakes challenges to secure additional food and treats for the group, and to avoid being voted out by viewers during their stay, with the final episode's votes nominating who wins a series.

The programme's first series debuted on 25 August 2002 and was filmed within Tully, Queensland, Australia. Series from 2003 to 2019 were filmed around Murwillumbah, New South Wales, Australia. The twentieth and twenty-first series were filmed in Gwrych Castle, Abergele, Wales before returning to Australia in 2022. Celebrities participating on the programme nominate a charity to receive a donation from ITV, with the money raised from charges on voting via text, phone or interactive services. Each series has been hosted by Ant & Dec, with the sole exception being the eighteenth series in 2018 when Ant McPartlin suspended his TV appearances for a year, so Declan Donnelly was joined instead by Holly Willoughby.

I'm a Celebrity is often a ratings winner for ITV, attracting on average over 9 million viewers each series, with its success spawning an international franchise of the same name. The main show was accompanied by a sister show from 2002 until 2019 on ITV2, entitled I'm a Celebrity: Extra Camp, which featured behind-the-scenes footage and discussions on celebrities voted out of the latest episode, and clips of the next episode. In February 2020, it was reported that ITV had renewed the show for at least 3 more series keeping it on air until at least 2022. In December 2021, it was reported the show will be kept on air until at least 2023. On 3 March 2022, it was announced that the show would return to Australia for the 2022 series. In April 2022, it was announced that an All-Stars series, set to be pre-recorded in South Africa would air in 2023. In 2022, the show won The Sir Bruce Forsyth Entertainment Award at the National Television Awards.

In 2023, Ant & Dec signed a new three-year contract with ITV which included presenting I’m a Celebrity…, meaning that the show will remain on air until 2025.

Format 

In return for their appearance on I'm a Celebrity...Get Me Out of Here!, the celebrities are asked to nominate a charity to which the producers, ITV Studios, make donations. The celebrities themselves are also paid a fee to compensate them for possible loss of earnings while they are in the jungle. The money is raised by allowing viewers to vote by phone for the celebrity they would like to complete a "Bushtucker Trial" – a physical task usually involving snakes, spiders or other creepy-crawlies found in the jungle – and, later in each series, to vote for the celebrity they would like to see win the show. The final remaining celebrity is declared the winner of the show, and is branded the "King” or “Queen".

Bushtucker trials 
Bushtucker trials are used in the show to allow the contestants to gain food and treats for camp. Bushtucker Trials take two formats: eating trials, or physical/mental tasks.

In the eating trials, contestants are required to eat a variety of different "jungle" foods. Each dish successfully eaten will gain the contestants one star, which equals one meal for camp (although the number of meals per star can vary). The foods that are required to be eaten can include: crickets (in a variety of forms, such as cooked into biscuits, blended into drinks or eaten dead), green ants, mealworms, witchetty grub, roasted spider or tarantulas, genitals of various animals, cockroach (prepared in various ways such as being cooked into biscuits, blended into drinks, eaten alive or dead). Other past foods include beach worms, bull's tongues, the anus of various animals, vomit fruits, cooked pigs' brains, various animal testicles, raw fish eyes, sheep eyes, blended rats or mice tails. Prior to the airing of the nineteenth series in 2019, ITV announced that eating trials would no longer contain live bugs.

The second type of challenge is more of a physical or mental task that requires the contestants to perform activities to gain stars. These can include searching through dung, going through tunnels, negotiating obstacles on high wires, or performing other tasks.

Dingo Dollar challenges 
Another way that contestants can earn treats is to do what is known as the "Dingo Dollar Challenge". This involves two or more celebrities going into the jungle to perform a task that releases an item to open a container with an amount of dingo dollars. Once that has been completed and the dollars have been retrieved, it is taken to a small woodshack shop, with shopkeeper Kiosk Keith, and in Series 18 onwards, Kiosk Kev.

In the 2020 series, as a result of not being able to film in Australia due to the COVID-19 pandemic, and the 2021 series due to the country's borders remaining shut, this challenge was replaced by a "Castle Coin Challenge", in-keeping with the theme of being at Gwrych Castle in Wales, rather than in the Australian Jungle. Other than that, the basic format of the challenge is the same. The only other format change to note is that Kiosk Kev has been replaced by his Welsh counterpart, Kiosk Cledwyn.

Filming locations

Queensland, Australia (2002) 
The first series of the show in 2002 was filmed on a smaller site at King Ranch (officially El Rancho del Rey) in Kooroomool, near Tully, Queensland, in Australia.

New South Wales, Australia (2003–2019, 2022–) 

Since the second series the following year, the programme has been filmed around Springbrook National Park, near Murwillumbah, New South Wales, Australia. The camp and filming studios are located in Dungay on Creek Road.

Inside the entrance to the filming location is an open area allocated to buildings which accommodate on-site medical facilities, containers for the storage of props, and other backstage facilities. Families and friends of the celebrities are housed here each morning during evictions. From this area, a restricted access road climbs to the site of the studios . The road then descends into a valley via four-wheel drive access to the set of the show.

Gwrych Castle, Wales (2020–2021) 

In August 2020, it was confirmed that due to the COVID-19 pandemic, the twentieth series would be filmed in Gwrych Castle in Abergele, North Wales.

As part of the agreement with Gwrych Castle Preservation Trust, ITV will help support the ongoing restoration project of the site. This has included the adding of permanent roofs to certain sections of the castle and repairs to the walls, floors and stairs to make the building safe and secure. ITV has reportedly donated £300,000 to the trust for the use of the site for four months, as well as paying for additional emergency restoration work. Production began on the site in September 2020.

On 2 August 2021, it was confirmed that the show would return to Wales for a second series, due to "continued uncertainty" over the COVID-19 pandemic and travel restrictions."

In October 2021, it was reported that ITV Studios' U.S. subsidiary and horror film studio Blumhouse was pitching a reboot of the American version of I'm a Celebrity under the title Celebrity Castle, which was reported to have expanded upon the series 20 concept.

South Africa (2023) 
In April 2022, it was announced that there would be a pre-recorded all-star spin-off series to be filmed in South Africa, rather than Australia or Wales.

Controversies 
In 2006, ITV apologised after confusion over instructions for telephone and red-button interactive voting led to allegations in the media that the wrong person had been evicted in the run-off vote between Toby Anstis and Dean Gaffney in the sixth series.

In November 2006, the series was forced to enhance its procedures after Ofcom found that it had breached Rule 1.16 of the Broadcasting Code for airing bad language before the watershed. An episode broadcast on 30 November 2006 was ruled to have breached Rule 2.2 of the Broadcasting Code after an investigation launched as part of the wider UK television public voting controversy. Due to late running, seven percent of phone and text votes for that episode of the show were not counted, although this did not affect the result.

Sarah Matravers blamed the series for the breakdown of her relationship with contestant Marc Bannerman after he flirted with Cerys Matthews in the seventh series. Matthews and Bannerman later alleged the footage had been edited by ITV.

Former Sex Pistols manager Malcolm McLaren, who was due to appear on the seventh series but pulled out at the last minute, alleged that the show and the choice of winner was fixed, and the trials posed no real danger. He alleged that the show doctor told him that "Things are so safe, I would send my own kids in to do the show. There is nothing bad in there. They're hoodwinking the public".

In 2009, ITV apologised for not having properly advised the contestants in the ninth series of the relevant Australian legislation regarding animal cruelty. Gino D'Acampo and Stuart Manning were charged by New South Wales Police after RSPCA Australia complained over their killing and eating of a rat during the show.

In 2012, the decision by Nadine Dorries to enter the show was the source of criticism, which led to her suspension from the Conservative Party due to allegations she did not seek permission from the party whip Andrew Mitchell, resulting in an inquiry by the Parliamentary Commissioner for Standards.

The fifteenth series saw Ferne McCann eat a live water spider as part of a bushtucker trial. Ofcom reportedly received 694 complaints from the public over allegations of 'animal cruelty for entertainment'. ITV also received a further 500 complaints. In January 2016, it was reported no further action would be taken.

In 2017, viewers complained that camp mate Iain Lee was the subject of bullying and isolation from other camp mates during the seventeenth series, and there were concerns raised due to the effect it could have on his mental health. There were calls for fellow contestant Rebekah Vardy to be cut as a mental health ambassador, due to her alleged role in the 'bullying'. On the ITV programme Good Morning Britain the day after her eviction, Vardy defended herself for remarks she made about Iain Lee in Extra Camp, the ITV2 spin-off series, stating that she was "under pressure", and that they were taken out of context. After his eviction from the camp, Dennis Wise also said on Good Morning Britain that he and Lee were on friendly terms, and said that ITV would not allow bullying on the show. He later accused the show of 'editing him' to look like a bully. Following his third place eviction, Lee directly addressed his relationship with those accused of 'picking on him', stating that he "loves them" and that there's "no beef between [them]". He also addressed claims that he had a "game plan", stating that he was just being himself.

In 2019, some viewers criticised Adele Roberts' elimination after a typing error in the app caused confusion over the votes. App votes were therefore not counted, which led to only phone votes to have an effect on the elimination.

That same year, Chris Packham wrote an open letter to Ant and Dec expressing his desire for them to retire the bushtucker trials.

On 13 November 2020, the RSPCA stated that it had "serious concerns about the welfare of animals" featured in the programme. They stated that the production company had got in touch with them ahead of the 20th series taking place in the UK, and had advised that consideration should be given to using welfare-friendly alternatives to animals in the Bushtucker trials, but that it was "really disappointed" that animals were still planned to be used in the trials. It recommended viewers could contact Ofcom, or ITV directly if they wanted to take action.

In November 2020 rural crime officers from North Wales Police began investigations into the ITV network after TV presenter and naturalist Iolo Williams complained that non-native insects, used in the show at Gwrych Castle, could escape and pose a threat to ecosystems. Gwrych Castle woods is a site of special scientific interest (SSSI), as is the nearby Coed y Gopa, managed by the Woodland Trust. Natural Resources Wales, which is responsible for regulating the release of non-native species did not receive an application from ITV to release non-native species. The release of species without a licence would be an offence under the Wildlife and Countryside Act. ITV said the programme "complies with animal welfare law concerning the use of animals, and we are proud of our exemplary production practices".

Series overview 

Key
 Winner – King or Queen of the Jungle
 Runner-up
 Third place
 Walked, withdrew or medically discharged
 Late arrival

Series 1 (2002) 

The first series consisted of 8 contestants, and was broadcast from 25 August to 8 September 2002.

Series 2 (2003) 

The second series consisted of 10 contestants, and was broadcast from 28 April to 12 May 2003.

Series 3 (2004) 

The third series consisted of 10 contestants, and was broadcast from 26 January to 9 February 2004.

Series 4 (2004) 

The fourth series consisted of 11 contestants, and was broadcast from 21 November to 6 December 2004.

Series 5 (2005) 

The fifth series consisted of 12 contestants, and was broadcast from 20 November to 5 December 2005.

Series 6 (2006) 

The sixth series consisted of 12 contestants, and was broadcast from 13 November to 1 December 2006.

 Team Base Camp
 Team Snake Rock

Series 7 (2007) 

The seventh series consisted of 11 contestants, and was broadcast from 12 to 30 November 2007.

 Team Croc Creek
 Team Snake Rock
 Entered after contestants were brought together

Series 8 (2008) 

The eighth series consisted of 12 contestants, and was broadcast from 16 November to 5 December 2008.

 Home Camp
 Away Camp
 Entered after contestants were brought together.

Series 9 (2009) 

The ninth series consisted of 13 contestants, and was broadcast from 15 November to 4 December 2009.

 Base Camp
 Camp Exile
 Left before camp was split

Series 10 (2010) 

The tenth series consisted of 13 contestants, and was broadcast 14 November to 4 December 2010. This was the first series to air on ITV HD.

 Camp Sheila
 Camp Bruce
 Entered after contestants were brought together

Series 11 (2011) 

The eleventh series consisted of 13 contestants, and was broadcast from 13 November to 3 December 2011.

 Team Snake Rock
 Team Croc Creek
 Entered after contestants were brought together

Series 12 (2012) 

The twelfth series consisted of 12 contestants, and was broadcast from 11 November to 1 December 2012.

 Team Snake Rock
 Team Croc Creek
 Entered after contestants were brought together

Series 13 (2013) 

The thirteenth series consisted of 12 contestants, and was broadcast from 17 November to 8 December 2013.

 Team Snake Rock
 Team Croc Creek
 Entered after contestants were brought together

Series 14 (2014) 

The fourteenth series consisted of 12 contestants, and was broadcast from 16 November to 7 December 2014. On 11 November, the full list of celebrities was confirmed by ITV.

 Team Croc Creek/Rescuer
 Team Celebrity Slammer
 Entered after contestants were brought together

Series 15 (2015) 

The fifteenth series consisted of 13 contestants and was broadcast from 15 November to 6 December 2015.

 Red Team (Leader: Tony Hadley)
 Yellow Team (Leader: Susannah Constantine)
 Entered after contestants were brought together

Series 16 (2016) 

The sixteenth series consisted of 12 contestants, and was broadcast from 13 November to 4 December 2016.

 Jungle Celebs
 City Celebs
 Entered after contestants were brought together

Series 17 (2017) 

The seventeenth series consisted of 12 contestants, and was broadcast from 19 November to 10 December 2017.

 Team Snake Rock
 Team Croc Creek
 Left before camp was split

Series 18 (2018) 

The eighteenth series consisted of 11 contestants, and was broadcast from 18 November to 9 December 2018. On 9 August 2018, McPartlin confirmed that he would not be presenting the series as he continued to get treatment after being admitted to rehab in March. On 29 August, ITV confirmed that Holly Willoughby would replace McPartlin as co-presenter alongside Donnelly. The lineup was confirmed on 12 November.

 Team Snake Rock
 Team Croc Creek
 Entered after contestants were brought together

Series 19 (2019) 

The nineteenth series consisted of 12 contestants, and was broadcast from 17 November to 8 December 2019. McPartlin rejoined the series as co-presenter, following a one-year hiatus.

 Team Snake Rock
 Team Croc Creek
 Entered after contestants were brought together

Series 20 (2020) 

The twentieth series of the show was confirmed in July 2020. This series was held in Gwrych Castle in North Wales due to travel restrictions cause by the COVID-19 pandemic, affecting travel to Australia. Two weeks prior to the start of the series, all participants, crew, and presenters were isolated to ensure that social distancing is not needed during filming. The line-up was announced on 8 November 2020 during I'm a Celebrity: A Jungle Story.

Series 21 (2021) 

 Team Castle Clink
 Team Main Camp
 Entered after contestants were brought together

Series 22 (2022) 

In March 2022, it was reported that the series would return to Australia for the first time since series 19 following reopening of Australia's borders for international visitors in February 2022, which will coincide with the reality show’s 20th anniversary.

Spin-offs

I'm a Celebrity: Extra Camp (2002–2019) 

A companion show, I'm a Celebrity: Extra Camp (previously I'm a Celebrity...Get Me Out of Here! NOW! from 2002 to 2015) was broadcast on ITV2 following every episode. It had been shown since the first series in 2002, and has featured a variety of presenters. However, on 9 January 2020, it was announced that the series had been axed due to high production costs.

I'm a Celebrity...The Daily Drop (2020) 
On 20 October 2020, ITV announced that an online spin-off show called I'm a Celebrity...The Daily Drop would be aired alongside the 2020 series hosted by Vick Hope on ITV Hub. In October 2021, it was confirmed that The Daily Drop would not return in 2021.

I'm a Celebrity: All-Stars (2023)

Books

References

External links 
 
 

2002 British television series debuts
2000s British reality television series
2010s British reality television series
2020s British reality television series
Ant & Dec
English-language television shows
 
ITV reality television shows
London Weekend Television shows
Television series by ITV Studios
Television shows filmed in Australia
Television shows filmed in the United Kingdom
Television shows produced by Granada Television
Television shows set in New South Wales
Television shows set in Queensland
Television shows set in Wales